Lorenzo Cannone (born 28 January 2001) is an Italian professional rugby union player who primarily plays number eight for Benetton of the United Rugby Championship.

Professional career 
Cannone has previously played for clubs such as Petrarca in the past. He signed for Benetton in June 2021 ahead of the 2021–22 United Rugby Championship.

In 2020 and 2021 Lorenzo Cannone was named in Italy U20s squad for annual Six Nations Under 20s Championship. On the 14 October 2021, he was selected by Alessandro Troncon to be part of an Italy A 28-man squad for the 2021 end-of-year rugby union internationals.
On 10th October 2022 he was selected by Kieran Crowley to be part of an Italy 33-man squad for the 2022 November Internationals matches against He made his debut against Samoa .

References

External links 

2001 births
Living people
Italian rugby union players
Benetton Rugby players
Rugby union flankers
Petrarca Rugby players
Italy international rugby union players
Sportspeople from Florence